The men's 1,500m metres was an event at the 1980 Summer Olympics in Moscow, Soviet Union. The final was held on Friday 1 August 1980. Forty athletes from 29 nations competed. The maximum number of athletes per nation had been set at 3 since the 1930 Olympic Congress. The event was won by Sebastian Coe of Great Britain, the nation's first championship in the event since back-to-back wins surrounding World War I in 1912 and 1920, and first medal of any color since 1932. East Germany took its first medal in the 1500 metres since starting to compete separately, with Jürgen Straub's silver.

Background

This was the 19th appearance of the event, which is one of 12 athletics events to have been held at every Summer Olympics. None of the 1976 finalists returned, with the American-led boycott keeping out defending champion John Walker of New Zealand as well as top American runner Steve Scott. Those two would have been strong challengers, but a British pair would have been co-favorites anyway. The world record was shared by Steve Ovett and Sebastian Coe, with Coe having a slightly faster time before the rounding required by the rules of the time. The British Olympic Association did not join the boycott, so Ovett and Coe raced in Moscow.

Benin, Botswana, Kuwait, Lesotho, Libya, Mozambique, Sierra Leone, Syria, Vietnam, and Zambia each made their first appearance in the event. Great Britain and France each made their 17th appearance, most of those competing in 1980, though still one fewer than the United States (which had had runners in each of the 18 previous 1500 metres competitions).

Competition format

The competition was again three rounds (used previously in 1952 and since 1964). The "fastest loser" system introduced in 1964 was used for both the first round and semifinals. The 9-man semifinals and finals from 1976 were retained.

There were four heats in the first round, each with 10 or 11 runners (before withdrawals). The top four runners in each heat, along with the next two fastest overall, advanced to the semifinals. The 18 semifinalists were divided into two semifinals, each with 9 runners. The top four men in each semifinal, plus the fastest fifth-placer, advanced to the 9-man final.

Records

These were the standing world and Olympic records prior to the 1980 Summer Olympics.

No new world or Olympic records were set during the competition.

Schedule

All times are Moscow Time (UTC+3)

Results

Round 1

Heat 1

Heat 2

Heat 3

Heat 4

Semifinals

Semifinal 1

Semifinal 2

Final

See also
 1976 Men's Olympic 1,500 metres (Montreal)
 1978 Men's European Championships 1,500 metres (Prague)
 1982 Men's European Championships 1,500 metres (Athens)
 1983 Men's World Championships 1,500 metres (Helsinki)
 1984 Men's Olympic 1,500 metres (Los Angeles)

References

External links
 
 Results

 1
1500 metres at the Olympics
Men's events at the 1980 Summer Olympics